Princess Marguerite Adélaïde Marie of Orléans, (born 16 February 1846, Pavillon de Marsan, Tuileries Palace, Paris, Kingdom of the French – died 24 October 1893, Paris, French Republic) was a member of the House of Orléans and a Princess of France by birth. Through her marriage to Prince Władysław Czartoryski, Marguerite was a princess of the House of Czartoryski.

Family

Marguerite was the third child of Prince Louis, Duke of Nemours and his wife Princess Victoria of Saxe-Coburg and Gotha.

Marriage and issue
Marguerite married Prince Władysław Czartoryski, second child of Prince Adam Jerzy Czartoryski and his wife Princess Anna Zofia Sapieha, on 15 January 1872 in Chantilly. Marguerite and Władysław had two sons:

Prince Adam Ludwik Czartoryski (5 November 1872 – 29 June 1937)
Prince Witold Kazimierz Czartoryski (10 March 1876 – 29 October 1911)

Ancestry

References

1846 births
1893 deaths
Czartoryski family
Princesses of France (Orléans)
Nobility from Paris
Royal reburials